Robert G. Marotz (November 14, 1921 June 23, 2012) was a Republican American politician.

Background
Born in Sheboygan, Wisconsin, Marotz graduated from Shawano High School. During World War II, Marotz served in the United States Marine Corps in the Pacific Theater from August 1941 to November 1943. He was sent to Officer Candidate School at Bowling Green State University and Dartmouth College. He was a member of the Wisconsin State Assembly from 1949 through 1959. He served five terms from Shawano County, Wisconsin in the Legislature, as Majority Leader from 1955 to 1957, and was elected Speaker of the Assembly from 1957 to 1959.

After the conclusion of World War II he returned to the study of law in the office of a lawyer and passed the bar exam. He was the last Wisconsin attorney admitted to practice of law by the state Supreme Court without benefit of formal law school training. He then enrolled at the University of Wisconsin Law School, completed the full 3 year coursework and obtained the law degree (LL. B).

Wisconsin State Assembly
 As member 1949-55 participated in revision of Criminal and Corporation Codes
 Chairman Legis. Council Judiciary Com. 1951-53
 Asst. Floor Leader 1953
 Rep. Floor Leader 1955
 Secretary 1955-57
 Elected Speaker of the Assembly 1957-59
 Chairman Legis. Council 1957-59
 Vice- chm. Interstate Cooperation Comn. 1957–59, member 1953-59
 Chosen Chief Clerk of the Assembly 1961-62

Political Involvement 
 Wisconsin Presidential Elector, 1956
 Lobbyist for Consolidated Freightways 1959-63
 Lobbyist for Wisconsin State Brewers Association 1963-93
 President of Wisconsin Society of Association Executives, 1973

References

External links 
 Robert G. Marotz, Wisconsin Historical Society, Wisconsin History
 Obituary
 State legislator Marotz, 90, sang a bipartisan tune

1921 births
2012 deaths
Military personnel from Wisconsin
Republican Party members of the Wisconsin State Assembly
Employees of the Wisconsin Legislature
People from Shawano County, Wisconsin
Politicians from Sheboygan, Wisconsin
Wisconsin lawyers
University of Wisconsin Law School alumni
20th-century American lawyers
United States Marine Corps personnel of World War II